Češnjice pri Zagradcu is a settlement east of Zagradec in the Municipality of Ivančna Gorica in central Slovenia. The area is part of the historical region of Lower Carniola. The municipality is now included in the Central Slovenia Statistical Region.

Name
The name of the settlement was changed from Češnjice to Češnjice pri Zagradcu in 1955.

References

External links

Češnjice pri Zagradcu on Geopedia

Populated places in the Municipality of Ivančna Gorica